Fort Nelson/Gordon Field Airport  is located near to Fort Nelson, British Columbia, Canada.

See also
Fort Nelson Airport
Fort Nelson (Parker Lake) Water Aerodrome
Fort Nelson/Mobil Sierra Airport

References

Registered aerodromes in British Columbia
Northern Rockies Regional Municipality